Letterkenny is a Canadian sitcom created by Jared Keeso, developed and written primarily by Keeso and Jacob Tierney, directed by Tierney, and starring Keeso, Nathan Dales, Michelle Mylett, and K. Trevor Wilson. Originally a YouTube web series called Letterkenny Problems, the show was commissioned for television by Crave in March 2015 and premiered in February 2016. The show follows the adventures of people residing in the fictional town of Letterkenny, a rural community in Ontario, Canada.

Letterkenny is distributed by Hulu in the United States, with the first two seasons debuting in July 2018. Subsequent seasons were added on December 27, 2018. Hulu acquired exclusive streaming rights to the show in the U.S. in May 2019. The 11th season was released via Crave on December 25, 2022, and on Hulu the following day. A spin-off series created by Keeso, Shoresy, based on the Letterkenny character of the same name debuted in 2022.

The show has received numerous awards and nominations, including a Canadian Screen Award for Best Comedy Series.

Overview
Letterkenny revolves around the titular small rural Ontario community, which took its name from Letterkenny in Ireland and is populated mostly by the descendants of Irish immigrants who escaped the 1840s Great Famine. Most episodes open with the text: "There are 5000 people in Letterkenny. These are their problems." The series focuses on siblings Wayne and Katy, who run a small farm and produce stand with help from Wayne's friends Daryl (often called “Dary”) and “Squirrely” Dan.

Episodes deal with small-town life amongst different types of people: the farmers (called "the hicks"), the out-of-towners who are members of the local ice hockey team, the town's obviously closeted Christian minister, the drug addicts (called "the skids"), the nearby First Nation reservation members (called "the natives"), the gym goers, the local Mennonites, and the Québécois. Early plots often revolved around Wayne defending his reputation as "the toughest guy in Letterkenny", the town's unsuccessful ice hockey team, the skids' schemes to rip off the residents of both Letterkenny and the natives, and Wayne's dating life after dumping his high school sweetheart who cheated on him.

The show is noted for subverting the common media trope of small-town residents being portrayed as narrow-minded and unintelligent: one running joke is that almost every character holds sophisticated views on social issues and can think quickly, with the latter usually exemplified by their ability to produce a near-constant flow of one-liners, puns, and wordplay during conversation.

Cast and characters

Production
The series is filmed in Sudbury, Canada. Letterkenny is the first original series commissioned by Crave, and premiered on that platform on February 7, 2016. The town of Letterkenny portrayed in the series is fictional and is not based on Brudenell, a town in Ontario sometimes called Letterkenny, though it is loosely based on Keeso's Ontario hometown of Listowel.

The show has its roots in Letterkenny Problems, a short-form web series created by Keeso and released on YouTube in 2013. The original Letterkenny Problems consisted almost entirely of Keeso and Dales trading off comedic one-liners while simply standing in various locations, a theme that would later resurface as the intro to some Letterkenny episodes. Letterkenny Problems garnered a Canadian Screen Award nomination for Best Original Fiction Program or Series Created for Digital Media at the 2nd Canadian Screen Awards in 2014.

Tierney and Michael Dowse are also involved in the production of the series. Tierney also has a supporting role as Pastor Glen in the series, whose cast also includes Michelle Mylett, Dylan Playfair, Andrew Herr, Tyler Johnston, Lisa Codrington, Alexander De Jordy, Kaniehtiio Horn and K. Trevor Wilson.

In March 2016, Letterkenny was renewed for a second season of six episodes. In August, just weeks after production wrapped on Season 2, CraveTV announced that they had ordered a third season. In March 2017, a St. Patrick's Day special episode, "St. Perfect's Day" was released. The third season, shot during the winter season, was released on Canada Day, July 1, 2017. In October 2017, a Halloween episode was released, and it was announced that the series had a new media partner which agreed to a production commitment for 40 new episodes, a 26 city Letterkenny Live! tour beginning in February 2018, and the expansion of Letterkenny merchandise.  A fourth season of six episodes was released in December 2017. The six-episode fifth season was released in June 2018.

The Letterkenny Christmas special was released in November 2018, followed by the 6-episode Season 6 in December. The Valentine's Day Special was released in February 2019, followed by the 6-episode Season 7 in October 2019. Season 8 (7 episodes) was released in December 2019, and Season 9 (7 episodes) was released in December 2020. In September 2020, seasons 10 and 11 were confirmed, with filming planned to begin in August 2020 but were delayed due to the COVID-19 pandemic. In June 2021, production began on seasons 10 and 11 and it was also announced that Shoresy, the hockey player voiced by Keeso but whose face has not been shown in Letterkenny, will be the lead in his own spinoff series, Shoresy.

Episodes

Season 1 (2016)

Season 2 (2016)

St. Patrick's Day special (2017)

Season 3 (2017)

Halloween special (2017)

Season 4 (2017)

Easter special (2018)

Season 5 (2018)

Christmas special (2018)

Season 6 (2018)

Valentine's Day special (2019)

Season 7 (2019)

Season 8 (2019)

Season 9 (2020)

Season 10 (2021)

International Women's Day special (2022)

Season 11 (2022)

Spin-offs

Littlekenny
In 2019, Bell Media announced the launch of Littlekenny, a six-episode animated spinoff. The series, an origin story focusing on the main characters as children, premiered on June 28. Episodes are between two and four minutes in length, and more closely follow the original Letterkenny Problems format than the extended universe of Letterkenny.

Shoresy

In June 2021, Bell Media announced a Letterkenny spin-off Shoresy based on the eponymous character played by Jared Keeso. The series was written by Keeso and directed by Jacob Tierney. It premiered on Crave on May 13, 2022.

Home media 
The series has been released on DVD in Canada by Elevation Pictures and in the United States by Universal Pictures Home Entertainment.

Reception

Critical reception
John Doyle of The Globe and Mail called the series "refreshing and intoxicating", and "funny, mad, droll, childish, and spiky."  Focusing on the show's characteristic use of often thick Ontario dialect, he wrote that "Not since Trailer Park Boys launched have we heard the flavourful, salty Canadian vernacular used with such aplomb and abandon"; but also that "Almost all the conversations are raw comedy and utterly plausible as small-town guy talk, not just in Canada but in villages and parishes wherever the grass grows." Alan Sepinwall of Rolling Stone called the show "marvelously goofy" and "strange, simple, [and] delightful".

The series has also been praised for its complex and fully-rounded depiction of its First Nations characters, which the producers attribute to the show's practice of involving the actors directly in the creation, writing and costuming of their characters.

Ratings
CraveTV has stated that Letterkenny's debut was the biggest debut of any series on their platform since it launched in 2014, and that as of March 10, 2016, nearly one in three subscribers have watched the series.

Accolades

Notes

References

External links

 
 Letterkenny on CraveTV
 
 

2016 Canadian television series debuts
2010s Canadian sitcoms
2020s Canadian sitcoms
Canadian comedy web series
Television shows set in Ontario
Television shows filmed in Greater Sudbury
Television series by Bell Media
Gemini and Canadian Screen Award for Best Comedy Series winners
Television series by DHX Media
Television series based on Internet-based works
Crave original programming